Russell King may refer to:
 Russell King (fraudster), involved in the purchase of Notts County Football Club
 Russell King (politician) (born 1940), Canadian physician and politician in New Brunswick